is a quarterly Japanese-language periodical and the official publication of the Insectivorous Plant Society of Japan. The journal was established in January 1950. As of 2010, it was published in A4 format and totals around 120 pages annually. The English title has been used alongside the original Japanese one from the April 1986 issue onwards.

Typical articles include matters of horticultural interest, field reports, literature reviews, and new taxon and cultivar descriptions. They are usually entirely in Japanese, although species descriptions may also be in English.

Taxon descriptions
The Journal of Insectivorous Plant Society has published formal descriptions of the following taxa.

Nepenthes
Nepenthes eymae (as N. eymai)
Nepenthes × ferrugineomarginata
Nepenthes × kinabaluensis
Nepenthes × kuchingensis
Nepenthes maxima f. undulata
Nepenthes mindanaoensis
Nepenthes peltata
Nepenthes × pyriformis (as a species)
Nepenthes rubromaculata (later homonym)
Nepenthes saranganiensis

Utricularia
Utricularia linearis
Utricularia ramosissima (regarded as a synonym of Utricularia geoffrayi)

Cultivars
The journal also published the following Nepenthes cultivar names of the 'Koto' series by K. Kawase.

Nepenthes 'Accentual Koto'
Nepenthes 'Dashy Koto'
Nepenthes 'Dinkum Koto'
Nepenthes 'Dreamy Koto'
Nepenthes 'Easeful Koto'
Nepenthes 'Ecstatic Koto'
Nepenthes 'Emotional Koto'
Nepenthes 'Facile Koto'

References

External links
  
 Complete article index (1950–2007) 
 Overview of issues from January 2000 to January 2004 

1950 establishments in Japan
Carnivorous plant magazines
Magazines established in 1950
Magazines published in Tokyo
Quarterly magazines